Ruth Lillegraven  (born October 21, 1978) is a Norwegian poet, novelist and children's writer. She made her literary debut in 2005 with the poetry collection Store stygge dikt. She was awarded the Brage Prize in 2013 for the poetry collection Urd.

References

1978 births
Living people
People from Granvin
Norwegian novelists
Norwegian children's writers
21st-century Norwegian poets
Norwegian women poets
21st-century Norwegian women writers